Svartsyn is a black metal band from Sweden formed in 1991 by multi instrumentalist, singer and lyricist Ornias.

History 
The band formed in 1991 as Chalice, but changed their name to Svartsyn in 1993 after the death of original drummer Tormentor. They recorded their first demo in 1994 and their first album in 1998. Draugen, ex-drummer of Dark Funeral, teamed up with original founding member Ornias in 1996 and worked smoothly together until Draugen left the band in 2010. 

In 1996 Svartsyn signed to Folter Records and released their debut album The True Legend. In May of the following year, a tour of 9 dates in the Netherlands and Germany with Behemoth and Desaster was made. After this tour, Kolgrim (of Unpure) replaced Surth. In June 1997 Svartsyn released Tormentor 7” EP. In September 1997 and October 1998 Svartsyn recorded their 2nd album entitled Bloodline at Sunlight Studios, which was released as a limited D-LP by End All Life Productions from Italy. In February 2000, Svartsyn recorded their 3rd album …His Majesty at Voisin Studios and they signed to Sound Riot Records for the release of this album. 

In 2003, Svartsyn signed with Sound Riot Records again for the release of their fourth album Destruction of Man and for the re-print of Bloodline album including the Tormentor 7” EP as bonus track. Destruction of Man was released in the summer 2003 and Bloodline in September 2005. Their fifth album Timeless Reign was released through Carnal Records from Sweden in September 2007.

After the departure of Draguen in 2010, Ornias continued recording music for subsequent albums and EPs. After signing with Agonia Records the band released their sixth album Wrath upon the Earth in January 2011 with brothers Zoran van Bellegem and Baruch van Bellegem from the Belgian band "Satyrus" as session musicians playing bass and drums, keyboards and samples respectively. The following year a re-recorded, re-mixed and re-mastered version of the band's debut album The True Legend with new artwork by frequent collaborator Chadwick St. John and a slightly changed track listing was released. 

The band's eighth studio album Black Sacrament was released in May 2013 and featured 
Ignace "Hammerman" Verstrate as a session drummer.
Ornias worked again with Hammerman to release Svartsyn's ninth studio album In Death in June 2017.

Members

Current 
 Ornias - vocals, guitars, bass (1991 - present)

Former 
 Draugen - drums (1996-2010)
 Kolgrim - bass (1996-2004)
 Whorth - bass (2001)
 Surth - drums (1994-1996)
 Tormentor - drums, vocals (1991 -1993; died 1993)

Live 
 Henke Svegsjö - guitars (1997-1998)

Discography

Studio albums 
 The True Legend (1998) 
 ...His Majesty (2000) 
 Destruction of Man (2003) 
 Bloodline (2005) 
 Timeless Reign (2007) 
 Wrath Upon The Earth (2011) 
 The True Legend Re-recording (2012) 
 Black Testament (2013) 
 In Death (2017) 
 Requiem (2020)

EPs 
 Tormentor (1998) [Black Militia] 
 Genesis of Deaths Illuminating Mysteries (2012) [Inferna Profundus Records]
 Nightmarish Sleep (2014) [Carnal Records]

LPs 
 Bloodline/His Majesty (2000) [End All Life Productions]
 A Night Created by the Shadows... and the Resuscitation of Unspoken Rituals (2019) [Nomad Snakepit Productions]

Split EPs 
 Kaos Svarta Mar/ Skinning the Lambs with Arckanum (2004) [Carnal Records / Blut & Eisen Productions]

Demos 
 Rehearsal '94 (1994)
 A Night Created by the Shadows (1995)
 Rehearsal '97 (1997)
 Skinning the Lambs (2003)

External links 
 Svartsyn at Myspace
 [ Svartsyn at AllMusic]

Musical groups established in 1991
Swedish black metal musical groups
1991 establishments in Sweden